North Prince Street Historic District is a historic tobacco warehouse complex and national historic district located at Lancaster, Lancaster County, Pennsylvania. It includes seven contributing buildings, built between about 1881 and about 1913. They are the Baumgardner Brothers Tobacco Warehouse (c. 1881); Standard Caramel Company Factory (1906); S.R. Moss Cigar Company (1907); Otto Eisenlohr Tobacco Warehouse (c. 1907); and the William Levy / Joseph Goldberg / Block Brothers Tobacco Warehouse (c. 1909, c. 1911, c. 1913).  All seven buildings are brick buildings, two to five stories tall, and six of the seven were used for the processing and storage of cigar leaf tobacco.

It was listed on the National Register of Historic Places in 1989.

References

Industrial buildings and structures on the National Register of Historic Places in Pennsylvania
Historic districts on the National Register of Historic Places in Pennsylvania
Buildings and structures in Lancaster, Pennsylvania
Historic districts in Lancaster County, Pennsylvania
Tobacco buildings in the United States
National Register of Historic Places in Lancaster, Pennsylvania